The R.A. Long building is a historic skyscraper in Kansas City, Missouri located on the northwest corner of the intersection of 10th Street and Grand Avenue.

In 1906, R.A. Long's Long-Bell Lumber Company had outgrown the office space in the Keith & Perry Building. Expanding operations and the need for a larger headquarters resulted in the construction of the R.A. Long Building, completed in 1907. This was the first all-steel framed building in Kansas City, Missouri with 16 stories and over 600 offices. Long's office was located on the 8th floor.

It was the first offices of the Federal Reserve Bank of Kansas City from 1914 to 1921 when it moved across the street to the newly constructed 925 Grand.

The renamed City National Bank & Trust Company opened their headquarters on the first floor in 1934. In 1947 the bank purchased the building.

The building was placed on the National Register of Historic Places on January 8, 2003.

In 2000 UMB started major renovations but the 8th and 14th floors were designated historic preservation floors to be restored to as close to original specifications as possible.

References

Buildings and structures in Kansas City, Missouri
Commercial buildings completed in 1907
Commercial buildings on the National Register of Historic Places in Missouri
Federal Reserve Bank of Kansas City
Federal Reserve Bank buildings
Government buildings in Missouri
National Register of Historic Places in Kansas City, Missouri